Larry McNabney (December 19, 1948 – September 12, 2001) was a Sacramento, California attorney whose body was found buried in a vineyard on February 5, 2002. 
After a nationwide manhunt, his wife, Elisa McNabney, was captured in Florida and arraigned for first-degree murder. The case made national headlines when police learned that her real name was actually Laren Sims, and that she had served time in a Florida prison for fraud and identity theft.  
Before Elisa could stand trial however, she hanged herself in her jail cell. Elisa's friend Sarah Dutra was later convicted of voluntary manslaughter and sentenced to 11 years in prison for murdering Larry McNabney.

Elisa McNabney (January 20, 1966 – March 31, 2002) was born Laren Renee Sims to parents Jesse and Jackie Sims in Attleboro, Massachusetts, before moving to Florida. Laren was a cheerleader and excellent student at Hernando High School; she had an IQ of 140. Despite her intelligence, she dropped out of high school, had two children with two different fathers, and started stealing. Laren was arrested for stealing a L'Oreal hair color kit from a Woolworth's in Tampa, Florida. After being released on that charge, she violated her probation by illegally using a credit card. She cut off her ankle monitor and headed to Las Vegas, Nevada with her daughter Haylei (born January 29, 1985).

Aliases
Over the years, Laren Sims had a total of 38 aliases, including:

Melissa Godwin
Tammy Keelin
Elizabeth Barasch – a woman she met in Florida prison
Elisa Redelsperger – the name she used when she met Larry McNabney
Shane Ivaroni – the name she used while she was on the run

Marriage to Larry McNabney
Elisa Redelsperger met Larry McNabney in 1995 when she applied for a job at his Las Vegas law office. She worked as his office manager and settled large cases. However, in late 1995, Larry's law firm was investigated by the Nevada State Bar, which determined that Elisa embezzled more than $140,000 from clients. Larry closed his offices in Reno and Las Vegas in Nevada and moved his practice to Sacramento, California. Despite this, Elisa became McNabney's fifth wife in 1996.

Murder
On September 10, 2001, following a horse show, Elisa McNabney and her fellow employee and friend Sarah Dutra, with whom she worked at the law office, injected Larry with the horse tranquilizer drug xylazine at a Los Angeles hotel. McNabney, 52, was last seen alive being pushed in a wheelchair by Sims at a Los Angeles horse show September 10. A day later, authorities said, Elisa (or Sims) started clearing out his office and sold his $110,000 horse trailer and truck. According to her later confession, Elisa drove to Yosemite National Park to bury Larry, but he was still alive and she returned with the unconscious Larry McNabney in the back seat to Sacramento. After his death the next day, September 12, from receiving the initial tranquilizer injection along with numerous later doses of other tranquilizer injections and mouth drops, it was estimated by the forensic examiners that Elisa and Sarah presumably had kept McNabney's body in the refrigerator in the McNabney garage for months. His body was later moved to the nearby winery near where it was finally discovered by San Joaquin County Sheriffs Office detectives in a shallow ditch near Linden, California on February 5, 2002. By that time however, Elisa had liquidated the couple's assets, totaling more than $500,000, and disappeared.

Manhunt
After the discovery of Larry's body, Elisa was the subject of a nationwide manhunt. She was going by the alias Shane Ivaroni and was hiding out in Destin, Florida. On March 20, 2002, Elisa was staying at her daughter Haylei's friend's house in Fort Walton Beach when she turned herself in.

Confession
She was booked into the Hernando County Jail and was to be extradited to California. While awaiting extradition, Elisa gave a full confession to law enforcement while in custody at the Okaloosa County, Florida Sheriff's Department. One week later, on Easter Sunday 2002, Elisa hanged herself in her jail cell.

Trial of Sarah Dutra
Sarah Dutra went on trial for the murder of Larry McNabney in 2003. She faced life imprisonment without parole if convicted of first-degree murder, but she was instead found guilty of voluntary manslaughter and being an accessory to murder. She was sentenced to the maximum of 11 years, 8 months in prison.

Aftermath
In Elisa McNabney's suicide note, she asked her lawyer to sue the Hernando County Jail for not preventing her suicide. She also asked that her children receive any funds raised from the lawsuit. "This is all I can give to my children... My actions now will allow them to move into the future without this heavy burden. They won't have to watch my trial on Court TV. It should all die with me," she wrote in the note. She also claims that she was not checked regularly in her cell, but an investigation has since disputed the charge.

Sarah Dutra was released from the Central California Women's Facility on August 26, 2011, after serving eighty-five percent of her eleven-year sentence.

This case was the basis for the made-for-TV movie Lies My Mother Told Me which aired on Lifetime in 2005. The film starred Joely Richardson as Elisa, Kailin See as Sarah, and Hayden Panettiere as Haylei. The case was featured on the television programs Dateline, Evil Stepmothers, Deadly Wives, and Snapped. The case is also the basis for the true-crime novel, Marked for Death by Brian J. Karem.

References 

Deaths by poisoning
Deaths by person in California
2002 in California
Mariticides
September 2001 crimes
September 2001 events in the United States
2001 murders in the United States